The Independent Workers' Party of Germany (UAPD) was a short-lived communist party in West Germany. The UAPD was formed in 1950 as a split from the Communist Party of Germany by Titoists after he broke with the Soviet Union. Hoping to steer the party toward Trotskyism, the German section of the Fourth International, the International Communists of Germany (IKD) entered the UAPD. After fighting claims that it was secretly financed by Tito, the party disbanded in 1952. The Trotskyists then entered the Social Democratic Party (SPD).

References 

Defunct communist parties in Germany
Political parties established in 1950
Political parties disestablished in 1952
1950 establishments in West Germany
1952 disestablishments in West Germany